Ronald George Hinings Adams  (31 December 1896 – 28 March 1979), known professionally as Ronald Adam, was a British officer of the RFC and RAF, an actor on stage and screen, and a successful theatre manager.

Early life
Adam was born in Bromyard, Herefordshire on 31 December 1896, the son of Blake Adams and his wife Mona Robin. His parents and grandparents were all in the theatrical profession. He was educated at University College School.

First World War
When still only 17 years old Adams volunteered to join the British Army on the outbreak of the First World War. On 2 December 1914 he was commissioned as a temporary Second Lieutenant in the 15th (Reserve) Battalion of the Middlesex Regiment. Adams soon transferred to the Royal Flying Corps (RFC) and served as an observer with No. 18 Squadron in France, before returning home to re-train as a pilot.
 
Once qualified as a pilot, Adams remained in Britain and flew Sopwith Camels with No. 44 Squadron on Home Defence duties. The squadron was based at Hainault Farm aerodrome in Essex and was pioneering the use of night-fighters against Zeppelin raids on London. 
He was then posted back to France, still on Sopwith Camels, to No. 73 Squadron, at Champien.

On 1 April 1918, the Royal Flying Corps amalgamated with the Royal Naval Air Service (RNAS) to become the Royal Air Force (RAF), but Adams had barely had time to get used to the new title before he was shot down, on 7 April 1918, near Villers-Bretonneux in Northern France, either by Hans Kirschstein, or possibly Manfred von Richthofen and captured. Adams was badly wounded in the engagement and on the evening of his capture he was visited by a German orderly who passed on the compliments of von Richthofen. Adams spent eight months in hospitals and prison camps before he was repatriated on 17 December 1918.

Acting career
After the war he trained as a chartered accountant, but his interest moved to theatre. He dropped the final "s" from his surname and adopted the stage name "Ronald Adam".
From 1924 to 1926, he was engaged as manager for Leslie Henson and Dion Titheradge, and at the Little, His Majesty's, and Strand theatres. He entered on the management of the Embassy Theatre, in April 1932, with the production of Madame Pepita, and made over 150 new productions and revivals from 1932 to 1939. Thirty of his productions were transferred to various West End theatres, including
Ten Minute Alibi, Close Quarters, The Dominant Sex, Professor Bernhardi and Judgment Day.
He presented several plays on tour, and acted in many of them, both at the Embassy and on their transfer.

He made his film debut with Strange Boarders, The Drum (both 1938) and Too Dangerous to Live (1939). Meanwhile, he continued with live theatre. At the Old Vic in June 1939 he played Lord Stagmantle in The Ascent of F6 and at the Phoenix in November 1939, Judge Tsankov in Judgment Day. He was director of Howard and Wyndham's Repertory Seasons in Edinburgh and Glasgow, 1938–39.

Second World War
On the outbreak of the Second World War Adam rejoined the RAF as a wing commander and served from 1939 to 1945. During the Battle of Britain in the summer of 1940 he was the Fighter Controller for the Hornchurch sector. It was Adam's job to co-ordinate the fighter command interceptions by using data gathered by radar and ground observers and then to dispatch fighters to intercept.There exists brief film footage of him in this role and can often be seen in documentaries on the war in the air. Jeffrey Quill, the distinguished Spitfire test pilot on attachment to 65 Squadron at Hornchurch during the Battle of Britain, wrote of Adam: 'Apart from being highly competent at the actual job, his voice had a quality of calm and unhesitating certainty. The contribution of such men to the outcome of the Battle of Britain was incalculable.'

During the war he continued to take part in films, for example as a German bomber chief in The Lion Has Wings (1939), as Mons. Besnard in At the Villa Rose (1940) and as Sir Charles Fawcett in The Foreman Went to France (1942).

Postwar period 
Adam was appointed an Officer of the Order of the British Empire (OBE) in 1946.

After 1946 he continued to act in live theatre. At the Garrick in March 1950 he played Mr Gibb in Mr Gillie. He made his Broadway debut in December 1951 in Antony and Cleopatra at the Ziegfeld Theatre. In 1954 he featured in William Douglas Home's comedy The Manor of Northstead in the West End.

His main activity at this stage, however, was in film and television. From 1946 to 1978 he took part in over 140 film or television productions. He portrayed the Group Controller in Angels One Five, a 1952 British war film about the Battle of Britain (Adam reprised his actual wartime role as a fighter Controller).

Selected filmography

 The Drum (1938) as Major Gregoff
 Strange Boarders (1938) as Barstow
 Kate Plus Ten (1938) as Police Chief
 Luck of the Navy (1938) as Enemy Ship's Captain (uncredited)
 Q Planes (1939) as Pollack - Aviation Engineer (uncredited)
 Inspector Hornleigh (1939) as Wittens, Pheasant Inn Manager
 Too Dangerous to Live (1939) as Murbridge / Wills
 The Missing People (1939) as Surtees
 The Lion Has Wings (1939) as German Bomber Chief
 Hell's Cargo (1939) as Capt. Dukes
 Meet Maxwell Archer (1940) as Nicolides
 At the Villa Rose (1940) as Mons. Besnard
 The Big Blockade (1942) as German businessman (uncredited)
 The Avengers (1942) as Daily Express Reporter in Phone Booth (uncredited)
 The Foreman Went to France (1942) as Sir Charles Fawcett Managing Director (uncredited)
 Escape to Danger (1943) as George Merrick
 Journey Together (1945) as Commanding Officer at Falcon Field
 Pink String and Sealing Wax (1945) as Clerk of the Court
 Green for Danger (1946) as Dr. White
 Take My Life (1947) as Det Sgt Hawkins. (Deaf Man.) (uncredited)
 The Phantom Shot (1947) as Caleb Horder
 Fame Is the Spur (1947) as Radshaws' Doctor (uncredited)
 An Ideal Husband (1947) as Member of Parliament (uncredited)
 Counterblast (1948) as Col Ingram, Gillington POW Camp Commandant
 Bonnie Prince Charlie (1948) as Macleod
 The Case of Charles Peace (1949) as Counsel for Defence
 All Over the Town (1949) as Sam Vane
 That Dangerous Age (1949) as Prosecutor
 The Bad Lord Byron (1949) as Judge
 Christopher Columbus (1949) as Talavera
 Helter Skelter (1949) as Director General of the BBC (uncredited)
 Obsession (1949) as Clubman #1
 Black Magic (1949) as Court President
 Under Capricorn (1949) as Mr. Riggs
 Diamond City (1949) as Robert Southey
 Boys in Brown (1949) as Judge (uncredited)
 My Daughter Joy (1950) as Col. Fogarty
 Shadow of the Past (1950) as Solicitor
 Seven Days to Noon (1950) as The Prime Minister
 The Late Edwina Black (1951) as Head-Master
 The Adventurers (1951) as van Thaal Snr.
 Captain Horatio Hornblower R.N. (1951) as Adm. McCartney
 Hell is Sold Out (1951) as Specialist
 Laughter in Paradise (1951) as Mr. Wagstaffe
 The Lavender Hill Mob (1951) as Turner
 The House in the Square (1951) as Ronson (uncredited)
 Mr. Denning Drives North (1951) as Coroner
 Angels One Five (1952) as Group Controller
 My Wife's Lodger (1952) as Doctor
 Circumstantial Evidence (1952) as Sir William Hanson QC
 Top Secret (1952) as Barworth Controller
 Hindle Wakes (1952) as Mr. Jeffcote
 Appointment in London (1953) as Instructor (uncredited)
 Martin Luther (1953)
 Malta Story (1953) as British Officer (uncredited)
 Flannelfoot (1953) as Insp. Duggan
 Escape by Night (1953) as Tallboy
 Stryker of the Yard (1953)
 The Million Pound Note (1954) as Samuel Clements (uncredited)
 Front Page Story (1954) as Editor
 Johnny on the Spot (1954) as Insp. Beveridge
 Forbidden Cargo (1954) as Mr. Bennett (uncredited)
 Seagulls Over Sorrento (1954) as Member of Admiralty Board (uncredited)
 The Beachcomber (1954) as Sir Henry Johnstone (uncredited)
 The Black Knight (1954) as The Abbot
 To Dorothy a Son (1954) as Parsons
 Thought to Kill (1954) as Gooch
 Tons of Trouble (1956) as Psychiatrist
 Private's Progress (1956) as Doctor at Medical
 The Man Who Never Was (1956) as Adams (uncredited)
 Bhowani Junction (1956) as General Ackerby (uncredited)
 Reach for the Sky (1956) as Air Vice-Marshal Leigh-Mallory
 Lust for Life (1956) as Commissioner De Smet
 Assignment Redhead (1956) as Dumetrius
 Around the World in 80 Days (1956) as Club Steward
 Sea Wife (1957) as Army Padre
 Kill Me Tomorrow (1957) as Mr. Brook
 Carry On Admiral (1957) as First Sea Lord
 The Surgeon's Knife (1957) as Maj. Tilling
 The Naked Truth (1957) as Chemist (uncredited)
 Woman and the Hunter (1957) as Insp. McGregor
 The Golden Disc (1958) as Mr. Dryden
 Carlton-Browne of the F.O. (1959) as Sir John Farthing
 The Man Who Could Cheat Death (1959) as Second Doctor (uncredited)
 Please Turn Over (1959) as Mr. Appleton
 And the Same to You (1960) as Trout
 Carry On Constable (1960) as Motorist (uncredited)
 Snowball (1960) as Mr. King
 Shoot to Kill (1960) as Wood
 Offbeat (1961) as J. B. Wykenham
 Three on a Spree (1961) as Judge
 Two Letter Alibi (1962) as Sir John Fawcett
 Satan Never Sleeps (1962) as Father Lemay (uncredited)
 Postman's Knock (1962) as Mr. Fordyce
 Heavens Above! (1963) as Cabinet Minister #1 (uncredited)
 The Haunting (1963) as Eldridge Harper
 Espionage (TV series) ('Do You Remember Leo Winters', episode) (1964) - Roger Upton
 The Tomb of Ligeia (1964) as Minister at Graveside
 Who Killed the Cat? (1966) as Gregory
 Song of Norway (1970) as Gade
 Zeppelin (1971) as Prime Minister
 The Ruling Class (1972) as Lord
 The Zoo Robbery (1973) as Zoologist
 The Man from Nowhere (1975) as George Harvey
 L'Amour en question (1978) as Le juge anglais (final film role)

Personal life
He married firstly Tanzi Cutava Barozzi; the marriage was dissolved. His second wife was Allyne Dorothy Franks. He had two children, Jane and David. After the Second World War Ronald Adam lived in Surbiton, Surrey, and died on 28 March 1979.

Written works 
Adam was part-adaptor of Professor Bernhardi and The Melody That Got Lost, among other works. He was the author of the plays An English Summer (1948), A Wind on the Heath (1949) and Marriage Settlement (1950), which he also produced.

He published a book on his theatrical memories:

In the middle of the war he wrote two novels arising from his experiences in the RAF. Initially they were published using the pseudonym "Blake",

Both of these were later republished under his own name.
He wrote again about his wartime experiences in:

References

External links

 

1896 births
1979 deaths
Military personnel from Herefordshire
British Army personnel of World War I
Middlesex Regiment officers
Royal Air Force personnel of World War I
English male film actors
English male stage actors
English aviators
British World War I pilots
Royal Flying Corps officers
Shot-down aviators
British World War I prisoners of war
World War I prisoners of war held by Germany
Royal Air Force wing commanders
Royal Air Force personnel of World War II
Officers of the Order of the British Empire
People educated at University College School
20th-century English male actors